Wien anders (ANDAS) is a political alliance in Vienna, Austria, created for the city's 2015 parliamentary and local elections. It consists of several parties, most notably the Communist Party of Austria and the Pirate Party of Austria.

External links

2015 establishments in Austria
Political parties established in 2015
Political party alliances in Austria
Communist Party of Austria